Evan Douglas Sayet (born October 29, 1960) is a comedian and conservative speaker.

Sayet is the author of The  Of Eden: How The Modern Liberal Thinks And Why He's Convinced That Ignorance Is Bliss.

Life and career

Evan was raised in a Jewish family. He is the creator and star of "The Right To Laugh – a night of Conservative Comedy," which is a conservative comedy show in America. Evan attended the University of Rochester where he majored in Political Science and English Literature. He moved to Hollywood to be in the entertainment industry and has spent over twenty-five years writing television shows, screenplays, documentaries and more before seguing into the field of political commentary.

References

External links

   Publications by Evan Sayet on Heritage Foundation
   Articles by Evan Sayet Listed on Human Events
   Washington Times – Evan Sayet
 

Year of birth uncertain
American political commentators
American stand-up comedians
Jewish American comedians
Living people
20th-century American comedians
21st-century American comedians
1960 births
21st-century American Jews